Many television shows and/or films have been filmed or set in the U.S. state of Minnesota.

Films
 The Adventures of Rocky and Bullwinkle (2000)
 Airport (1970) (box office #1 film in the U.S.)
 An American Romance (1944)
 Angus (1995)
 Aurora Borealis (2006)
 Beautiful Girls (1996)
 Best Man Down (2012)
 Big Bully (1996)
 The Big One (1997)
 Bill (1981)
 The Bishop's Wife (1947)
 Bloodstained Memoirs (2009)
 Clouds (2020)
 Cologne: From the Diary of Ray and Esther (1939)
 Contagion (2011) (box office #1 film in the U.S.)
 Crossing the Bridge (1992)
 The Cure (1995)
 D2: The Mighty Ducks (1994) (box office #1 film in the U.S.)
 D3: The Mighty Ducks (1996)
 Dear White People (2014)
 Drop Dead Fred (1991)
 Drop Dead Gorgeous (1999)
 Embrace of the Vampire (1995)
 The Emigrants (1971)
 Equinox (1992)
 The Eyes of Tammy Faye (2000) 
 Factotum (2005)
 Fargo (1996)
 Feeling Minnesota (1996)
 Foolin' Around (1980)
 Ghost from the Machine (2010)
 God's Country (1985)
 The Good Son  (1993)
 Graffiti Bridge (1990)
 The Great Northfield Minnesota Raid (1972)
 Grumpier Old Men (1995)
 Grumpy Old Men (1993)
 The Heartbreak Kid (1972)
 Here On Earth (2000)
 Herman U. S. A. (2001)
 I Am Not a Serial Killer (2016) 
 Ice Castles  (1978)
 Inside Out (2015) 
 Into Temptation (2009)
 Iron Will (1994)
 Jennifer's Body (2009)
 Jingle All the Way (1996)
 Joe Somebody (2001)
 Juno (2007)
 Killer Movie (2008)
 Kumiko, the Treasure Hunter (2014)
 Leatherheads (2008)
 Life Partners (2014)
 Little Big League (1994)
 Los Enchiladas! (1999)
 Major League: Back to the Minors (1998)
 Mallrats (1995)
 Martha, Meet Frank, Daniel and Laurence (1998)
 The Mighty Ducks (1992)
 Miracle (2004)
 The Monster of Phantom Lake (2006)
 Mystery Science Theater 3000: The Movie (1996)
 New in Town (2009)
 The New Land (1972)
 North Country (2005)
 Older Than America (2008)
 One More Saturday Night (1986)
 Overnight Delivery (1998)
 The Personals (1982)
 A Prairie Home Companion (2006)
 Purple Haze (1982)
 Purple Rain (1984) (box office #1 film in the U.S.)
 Rachel River (1987)
 Rio (2011) (beginning of the film) 
 A Serious Man (2009)
 Sign o' the Times (1987)
 A Simple Plan (1998)
 A Stray (2016)
 Stuart Saves His Family (1995)
 Stuck Between Stations (2011)
 Sugar & Spice (2001)
 Sweet Land (2005)
 That Was Then... This Is Now (1985)
 Thin Ice (2011)
 The Toilers and the Wayfarers (1996)
 Trauma (1993)
 Twenty Bucks (1993)
 The Unearthing (2015)
 Untamed Heart (1993)
 The Very Thought of You (1998)
 Wildfire the Arabian Heart (2010)Wilson (2017)
 With Honors (1994)
 Wooly Boys (2001)
 Wrongfully Accused (1998)
 You'll Like My Mother (1972)
 Young Adult (2011)

Television
 Ascension (2014)
 The Bachelorette (2021)
 Beyond the Prairie: The True Story of Laura Ingalls Wilder (2000, 2002)
 The Big C (2010-2013)
 Big Time Rush (2009-2013)
 Coach (1989-1997)
 Fargo (2014-present)
 Fillmore! (2002-2004)
 Get a Life (1990-1992)
Golan the Insatiable (2013-2015)
 Happy Town (2010)
 Laurel Avenue (1993)
 Life With Louie (1995-1998)
 Little House on the Prairie TV miniseries (2004)
 Little House on the Prairie TV series (1974-1982)
 Lucan (1977-1978)
 Mall Cops: Mall of America (2009-2010)
 The Many Loves of Dobie Gillis (1959-1963)
 The Mary Tyler Moore Show (1970-1977)The Mighty Ducks: Game Changers (2021-present)
 My Gym Partner's a Monkey (2005-2008)
 Mystery Science Theater 3000 (1988-1999)
 Newton's Apple (1983-1999)
 Orphan Black (2013-2017)
 100% Freeze-Dried Minnesota (1979)
 The Adventures of Rocky and Bullwinkle and Friends (1959-1964)
 The Tom Show (1997-1998)
 Voices Within: The Lives of Truddi Chase'' (1990)

References

Further reading
 

Minnesota in fiction
Films set in Minnesota
Television shows set in Minnesota